Thomas A. Baker (born May 9, 1935) is a retired lieutenant general in the United States Air Force who served as commander of the Twelfth Air Force, deputy commander in chief of United Nations Command and vice commander of Tactical Air Command. He was commissioned in 1957 and retired in 1993.

References

1935 births
Living people
People from Golconda, Illinois
Military personnel from Illinois
United States Air Force generals